Seattle is regarded as a world center for coffee roasting and coffee supply chain management. Related to this, many of the city's inhabitants are coffee enthusiasts; the city is known for its prominent coffee culture and numerous coffeehouses.

Coffee consumption and culture
People in Seattle consume more coffee than in any other American city; one study stated that there are 35 coffee shops per 100,000 residents and that Seattle people spend an average of $36 a month on coffee. It is nearly impossible to walk past a single block in a commercial area in Seattle without walking past at least one coffee shop. Coffee drinkers can get coffee at a local sidewalk stand, parking lot, tiny coffee houses, big coffee houses, drive-through, and even delivery.

Several Seattle Ethiopian restaurants carry forward one or another degree of Ethiopian coffee tradition, which includes doing their own roasting. These include the Jebena Cafe in Pinehurst, Kaffa Coffee & Wine Bar in the Rainier Valley, and Adey Abeba in the Central District.

In the early 2000s in Seattle a coffee concept called the bikini barista began to be implemented by various marketers throughout the area.  Coffee distribution in this business model utilizes baristas wearing little clothing to prepare and serve the coffee.

Roasters

Numerous coffee roasting companies are headquartered in Seattle, including:
 Anchorhead Coffee
 Conduit Coffee Roasters
 Fonté Coffee Roasters
 River Trail Roasters
 Caffè Umbria
 Torrefazione Italia
 Fremont Coffee Company
 Herkimer Coffee
 Kuma Coffee
 Caffe Appassionato
 Caffe Ladro
 Top Pot Coffee Roasters
 Victrola Coffee Roasters
 Lighthouse Roaster,
 Zoka Coffee Roaster and Tea Company

Storyville Coffee also operates within the Seattle metropolitan area.

Starbucks
Starbucks is Seattle's largest coffee retailer. It was founded in 1971 in Pike Place Market as a roaster, but only later became an espresso bar.  In 1984 ownership of the company changed and Howard Schultz led a massive international expansion of the company. In 2003, Starbucks acquired pioneering Seattle roaster Seattle's Best Coffee (SBC, originally Stewart Brothers' Coffee).

Tully's Coffee
Tully's Coffee was at one time Seattle's second-largest coffee retailer. As of March 2018 there no longer are any Tully’s retail locations in the United States. Tom Tully O'Keefe founded the chain in Kent, Washington in 1992 to rival the expansion of Starbucks with an alternative business model.

Caffé Vita Coffee Roasting Company
Caffé Vita Coffee Roasting Company was founded in 1995 to produce excellent artisan coffee and to implement an ethical model for coffee production which bypassed the fair trade business model and sourced coffee beans directly from the farmers producing it.

Espresso Vivace
Espresso Vivace is a set of coffeehouses and a roaster.  Founded in 1988 by a Boeing engineer, the coffee is produced to exacting specifications to match the owner's taste and the taste of patrons who prefer this different blend.

Stumptown
Portland-based Stumptown Coffee Roasters opened a roasting facility in Seattle in 2010. 
On October 6, 2015, it was announced that San Francisco-based Peet's Coffee (a division of JAB Holding Company of Germany, since 2012) would acquire Stumptown.

Coffeehouses

Seattle coffeehouse culture includes chains, such as Starbucks, Tully's Coffee and Seattle's Best Coffee, alongside many independently owned coffee shops. Independently owned coffee shops include:

 Boon Boona Coffee
 Café Allegro
 Caffé D’arte
 Caffè Umbria
 Caffé Vita
 Cherry Street Coffee House
 Drinkmore Cafe
 Espresso Vivace
 Ghost Alley Espresso
 Hello Em
 Kaladi Brothers Coffee
 Monorail Espresso
 Overcast Coffee Company
 Pegasus Coffee Company
 Top Pot Doughnuts
 Elm Coffee Roasters
 Slate Coffee
 Victrola
 Zeitgeist Coffee
 Zoka Coffee

Café Allegro

Café Allegro is a coffeeshop in University District. Its founder worked with Starbucks roasters to develop the original Starbucks espresso roast, which is darker than most other roasts but still lighter than the darkest roast. That espresso roast remains the standard Starbucks espresso offering, but it was developed for Café Allegro.

Last Exit on Brooklyn
The Last Exit on Brooklyn was a coffee house which opened in 1967 and closed in 2000. It was a gathering place for high-level chess players and intellectuals, and the proprietor worked to "create a haven where students and the benign crazies" were welcome and where "everyone felt equal and there were no sacred cows".

Top Pot Doughnuts
Top Pot Doughnuts was founded in 2002 on Capitol Hill as a pastry bakery which also roasts and sells coffee. It has since expanded to locations across the Puget Sound region and Dallas, Texas.

Bauhaus Coffee and Books
A precursor to Top Pot Doughnuts; Bauhaus Strong Coffee was founded on October 5, 1993, and is notable for an unusual coffeehouse space design, which the Top Pot Doughnuts co-founders later applied to its design. While the original location closed on October 5, 2013, a new Capitol Hill location later opened that year, following two new locations in Ballard and Green Lake. All three were closed abruptly on December 13, 2015. Owner Joel Radin filed bankruptcy in February 2017.

Coffee technology
In 2007 the Coffee Equipment Company released a product called the Clover, which was a machine which brewed coffee one cup at a time.  The company was acquired by Starbucks who now produces the Clover.

Coffee events
Coffee: World in your Cup is the name of an exhibition and community series which premiered in Seattle through most of 2009 at the Burke Museum.  The exhibition includes displays of equipment at the museum and a lecture series with talks in various locations wherein experts talk about aspects of the coffee industry.

The World Barista Championship was held in Seattle in April 2015. The competition, and its winner Sasa Sestic, were the subject of a documentary film The Coffee Man.

Seattle coffee in popular culture
In the NBC series Frasier, the characters are often seen drinking coffee at the fictional Café Nervosa, which is said to have been inspired by the real-life Elliott Bay Café.

See also
 Coffee in Portland, Oregon

References

External links

 
Seattle
Culture of Seattle
Tourist attractions in Seattle